Problepsis argentea is a moth of the  family Geometridae. It is found on Dammer Island (the Maluku Islands).

The wingspan is about 32 mm. The forewings and hindwings are silvery white, sprinkled with fine black scales, without any markings. The underside is also white, but without any black scales.

References

Moths described in 1900
Scopulini
Moths of Indonesia